Malcolm Mussen Lamoh is a Malaysian politician who has served as State Deputy Minister of International Trade and Investment of Sarawak under Premier Abang Abdul Rahman Johari Abang Openg and Minister Awang Tengah Ali Hasan since January 2022 and Member of the Sarawak State Legislative Assembly (MLA) for Batang Ai since May 2016 and Batang Air from April 2009 to May 2016. He also served as the State Deputy Minister of International Trade and Industry, Industrial Terminal and Entrepreneur Development (Development and Industry) in the GPS state administration under Abang Johari and Awang Tengah from September to December 2021. He is a member of the Parti Rakyat Sarawak (PRS), a component party of the ruling Gabungan Parti Sarawak (GPS) coalition. He was elected in 2009 Batang Air by-election after the incumbent died of heart attack and re-elected in 2011, 2016 and 2021.

Mussen holds a bachelor's degree from Universiti Putra Malaysia and a master's degree from the University of Warwick. He is former Senior Engineer in Public Works Department Sarawak. He can speak fluently in Bahasa Malaysia, English, Japanese and Mandarin.

Election results

References

Alumni of the University of Warwick
Living people
Malaysian engineers
Parti Rakyat Sarawak politicians
Year of birth missing (living people)
Members of the Sarawak State Legislative Assembly